Donald Darell Strickland (born November 24, 1980) is a former American football cornerback. He was drafted by the Indianapolis Colts in the third round of the 2003 NFL Draft. He played college football at the University of Colorado Boulder.

Strickland has also played for the Philadelphia Eagles, San Francisco 49ers, San Diego Chargers, and New York Jets.

Early years
Strickland attended Archbishop Riordan High School in San Francisco, California.  As a senior at Riordan, Strickland was a standout All-League running back.  His uncle, Raymond Bell, played at UCLA and his cousin, Herb Ward, played at Southern California and in the NFL with the Dallas Cowboys. Strickland's father, Donald, is a retired photographer for the NBC affiliate, KRON-4 in the Bay Area.

College career
Strickland attended the University of Colorado. Strickland was a key part in the Buffaloes' run to a Big 12 Conference Championship in 2001. He had 78 tackles and two interceptions, both returned for touchdowns. In 2002, he had 86 tackles, and one interception returned 95 yards for a touchdown.

Professional career

Indianapolis Colts
Strickland started for the Indianapolis Colts from 2003 until the first game of 2005 when he injured himself.

Philadelphia Eagles
He was picked up by the Philadelphia Eagles later that season, playing in three games. The Eagles waived Strickland during the 2006 training camp.

San Francisco 49ers
The San Francisco 49ers acquired him as a free agent on October 31, 2006. The 49ers released Strickland on February 26, 2007, but re-signed him on March 6, 2007 to a one-year deal. He re-signed with the 49ers on March 21, 2008 to a one-year contract.

New York Jets
An unrestricted free agent in the 2009 offseason, Strickland signed with the New York Jets on March 25. He was released on March 5, 2010.

San Diego Chargers

Strickland signed with the San Diego Chargers on March 12, 2010.  After one season in San Diego, he was released on July 28, 2011.

Second stint with Jets
On July 30, 2011, Strickland was re-signed by the New York Jets.

References

External links
New York Jets bio

1980 births
Living people
Players of American football from San Francisco
African-American players of American football
American football cornerbacks
Colorado Buffaloes football players
Indianapolis Colts players
Philadelphia Eagles players
San Francisco 49ers players
New York Jets players
San Diego Chargers players
21st-century African-American sportspeople
20th-century African-American people